Leroy Smith (born January 6, 1969) is a former college football player for the Iowa Hawkeyes from 1988 to 1991.  He was a defensive lineman that was named a consensus first team All-American and the Big Ten's Defensive Player of the Year in 1991.

Playing career
Smith arrived at the University of Iowa from Sicklerville, New Jersey.  He played running back in high school but moved to the defensive end position in college, because the Hawkeyes already had a stockpile of good running backs.  As a junior in 1990, Smith played on Iowa's Big Ten championship team that went to the Rose Bowl.

Smith had perhaps the most dominating senior season a Hawkeye defensive end has ever had.  His signature game came against Ohio State in 1991.  He recorded 14 tackles, including a school-record five quarterback sacks, in Iowa's 16–9 victory.  Smith had 18 sacks on the season, which broke a Big Ten record that had stood for 14 years.

In 1995 he joined Rhein Fire, a German team that played in the World League of American Football.

Honors

Leroy Smith was named a consensus first team All-American in 1991, as he helped lead Iowa to a 10–1–1 record and a top ten finish in the national rankings.  He was also named both the Big Ten Defensive Lineman of the Year and the Big Ten Defensive Player of the Year.

References

1969 births
Living people
All-American college football players
American football defensive ends
American football linebackers
Iowa Hawkeyes football players
People from Winslow Township, New Jersey
Rhein Fire players
Toronto Argonauts players